The Poultry Bowl was an American college football bowl game played in 1973 and 1974 in Gainesville, Georgia and Greensboro, North Carolina.

The Stephen F. Austin Lumberjacks beat the Gardner–Webb Bulldogs, 31–10.

The bowl was aimed at small colleges that did not have opportunities to play in major bowl game. For the initial game, the selection committee also considered , Jacksonville State, Troy State, Grambling,  and  before settling on Stephen F. Austin and Gardner–Webb.

The Lumberjacks' mobile quarterback Larry Mayer scored one touchdown and set up others. The halftime score was 10–3, but Stephen F. Austin dominated the second half, featuring long runs by Mayer, tailback John Reece and fullback Bill Tyler. Gardner–Webb used their passing game to move the ball, but couldn't keep up with the Lumberjacks. Unfortunately, cold rain that fell two hours before kickoff and the crowd was estimated at only 1,000.

1973 was the first and only Poultry Bowl played in Gainesville. The game was played the following  year at the historic World War Memorial Stadium in Greensboro, North Carolina. In 1974, Dennis Haglin took over the position of head coach at Guilford from Henry Vansant, who had resigned. The game ended in a 7–7 tie,  but a tiebreaker was used, most first downs, and Guilford was given an 8–7 victory.

Game results

References

Defunct college football bowls